Riu or RIU may refer to:

People 
 Riu (surname), a Korean surname
 Giovanni de Riu (1925–2008), Italian racing driver
 Ramon Riu i Cabanes (1852–1901), Bishop of Urgell and ex officio Co-Prince of Andorra
 Victor Riu (born 1985), French golfer

Other uses 
 Rancho Murieta Airport, in California, United States
 Riau Airlines, defunct Indonesian airline
 Riu de Cerdanya, in Catalonia, Spain
 RIU Hotels, a Spanish hotel chain